Cham Sundaravadin (or ; 1866–1949), better known by his noble title Phraya Sanoduriyang, was a Thai court musician who served in the royal courts of kings Chulalongkorn (Rama V) to Prajadhipok (Rama VII). He was highly regarded as an expert of Thai classical music, receiving the Dushdi Mala Medal as recognition in 1908, and was one of the only two court musicians to achieve the noble rank of phraya.

References

Thai musicians of Thai classical music
Phraya
Recipients of the Dushdi Mala Medal, Pin of Arts and Science
1866 births
1949 deaths